Ali Efe Yeğin (born 31 August 1993 in Balıkesir) is a Turkish professional motorcycle racer. He won the 2017 BMU European f600 championship. He competed in the European Superstock 1000 Championship in 2018 for Nutec - Benjan – Kawasaki Team on a Kawasaki Ninja ZX-10RR.

Career
Yeğin is the holder of three national championship  titles.

He won the 2017 f600 BMU European championship

He won the 2017 Turkey fastest 600gp championship

He won the 2016 600cc rosbk championship

He won the 2017 600cc Bulgaria national championship

He won the 2017 600cc Romania national championship

By October 2017, he competed in the 11th and 12th rounds of the Balkan Motorcycle Union's BMU European Road Racing Championship held at the Serres Racing Circuit in Greece. He won the race in the F600 class. He won the 2016-2017 Turkey 600gp class championship race.

Supported by the World Supersport champion Kenan Sofuoğlu and his team Kawasaki Puccetti Racing, Yeğin was recruited by the Nutec - Benjan – Kawasaki Team by March 2018. He debuted as a professional internationally in the 2018 European Superstock 1000 Championship in MotorLand Aragón, Spain.

References

1993 births
Living people
Sportspeople from Balıkesir
Turkish motorcycle racers
Turkish sportsmen
FIM Superstock 1000 Cup riders